National Road 91 (abbreviated as EO91) is a highway in Attica, Greece. It runs from the centre of Athens to Sounio, via Vouliagmeni. It was first constructed in the 1950s as a one lane per direction road, but the section between central Athens and Varkiza was later extended to two lanes per direction. It has many extremely dangerous curves, and accidents happen frequently. Currently, there are no plans to replace it with a bypass or reconstruct certain dangerous parts, but there has been an effort to increase police presence to prevent illegal racing and violation of speed limits which were common phenomena over the last 10 years. The highway becomes busier during the summer, as most of the places it connects are popular vacation spots. The highway also goes past what was Ellinikon International Airport  (Athens old airport).

Route
National Road 91 begins in the centre of Athens, and runs southwest to the Saronic Gulf coast at Palaio Faliro. This section is named Andrea Syngrou Avenue. From Palaio Faliro it continues southeast along the coast, passing along the southern and southeastern suburbs of Athens. The section between Palaio Faliro and Varkiza is named Poseidonos Avenue.

National Road 91 passes through the following places:

Central Athens
Nea Smyrni
Palaio Faliro
Alimos
Elliniko
Glyfada
Voula
Vouliagmeni
Varkiza
Agia Marina
Lagonisi
Saronida
Palaia Fokaia
Legrena
Sounio

91
Roads in Attica
Streets in Athens